Dr. Josef Gruss (pseudonym Josef Mičovský; 8 July 1884 – 28 May 1968) was a Czech tennis player. He competed for Bohemia in the men's singles event at the 1908 Summer Olympics.

References

1884 births
1968 deaths
Czech male tennis players
Olympic tennis players of Bohemia
Tennis players at the 1908 Summer Olympics
Tennis players from Prague
Czechoslovak physicians
Sportspeople from the Austro-Hungarian Empire